Armenian War may refer to:
Armenian-Parthian War, 87-85 BCE
Roman-Parthian War of 58-63 CE
Armenian genocide, beginning 1915
Georgian-Armenian War, 1918
Armenian–Azerbaijani war (disambiguation), 1918-1922